Vasant Panchami, also rendered Vasanta Panchami and Saraswati Puja in honour of the Hindu goddess Saraswati, is a festival that marks the preparation for the arrival of spring. The festival is celebrated in Indian religions in different ways depending on the region. Vasant Panchami also marks the start of preparation for Holika and Holi, which take place forty days later. The Vasant Utsava (festival) on Panchami is celebrated forty days before spring, because any season's transition period is 40 days, and after that, the season comes into full bloom.

Nomenclature and date
Vasant Panchami is celebrated every year on the fifth day of the bright half of the Hindu lunisolar calendar month of Magha, which typically falls in late January or February. Spring is known as the "King of all Seasons", so the festival commences forty days in advance. It is generally winter-like in northern India, and more spring-like in central and western parts of India on Vasant Panchami, which gives credence to the idea that spring is actually in full bloom 40 days after the Vasant Panchami day.

The festival is particularly observed by Hindus in the Indian subcontinent, notably India and Nepal. It has been a historical tradition of Sikhs as well. In southern states, the same day is called Sri Panchami.

On the island of Bali and the Hindus of Indonesia, it is known as "Hari Raya Saraswati" (great day of Saraswati). It also marks the beginning of the 210-day long Balinese Pawukon calendar.

Hinduism

Saraswati Puja 
Vasant Panchami is a festival of Hindus and Sikhs that marks the beginning of preparations for the spring season. It is celebrated by people in various ways depending on the region. Vasant Panchami also marks the start of preparation for Holika and Holi, which occur forty days later. For many, Vasant Panchami is the festival dedicated to goddess Saraswati who is their goddess of knowledge, language, music, and all arts. She symbolizes creative energy and power in all its forms, including longing and love. The season and festival also celebrate the agricultural fields' ripening with yellow flowers of mustard crop, which Hindus associate with Saraswati's favorite color. People dress in yellow saris or shirts or accessories, share yellow-colored snacks and sweets. Some add saffron to their rice and then eat yellow cooked rice as a part of an elaborate feast.

Many families mark this day by sitting with babies and young children, encouraging their children to write their first words with their fingers, and some study or create music together. The day before Vasant Panchami, Saraswati's temples are filled with food so that she can join the celebrants in the traditional feasting the following morning. In temples and educational institutions, statues of Saraswati are dressed in yellow and worshiped. Many educational institutions arrange special prayers or pujas in the morning to seek the blessing of the goddess. Poetic and musical gatherings are held in some communities in reverence for Saraswati.

In Eastern India, primarily in the states of West Bengal, Bihar, Tripura and Assam, as well as in Nepal, people visit Saraswati temples and also worship Goddess Saraswati at home (Saraswati Puja). In West Bengal, it's one of the major festivals for Bengali Hindus and observed by many households; most schools arrange Saraswati puja for their students on their premises. In Bangladesh too, all major educational institutes and universities observe it with a holiday and a special puja.

In the state of Odisha, the festival is celebrated as Basanta Panchami/Sri Panchami /Saraswati Puja. Homas and Yagnas are done in schools and colleges across the state. Students celebrate Saraswati puja with great sincerity and fervor. Usually, children four and five years old start learning on this day in a unique ceremony named 'Khadi-Chuan' or 'Vidya-Arambha'. - this is known as "Haate-Khori" among Bengali Hindus. 

In southern states such as Andhra Pradesh, the same day is called Sri Panchami where "Sri" refers to her as another aspect of the one goddess Devi.

Other deities 

Another legend behind Vasant Panchami is based on the Hindu god of love called Kama. Pradyumna is Kamadev personified in Krishna's Book. Thus Vasant Panchami is also known as "Madana Panchami". Pradyumna is the son of Rukmini and Krishna. He awakens the passions of the earth (and its people) and thus the world blooms anew.

It is remembered as the day when the Seers (Rishis) approached Kama to wake up Shiva from his Yogic meditation. They support Parvati who is doing a penance to get Shiva as husband and seek Kama's help to bring Shiva back from his meditation to worldly desires. Kama agrees and shoots arrows, made of flowers and bees, at Shiva from his heavenly bow of sugarcane in order to arouse him to pay attention to Parvati. Lord Shiva awakens from his meditation. When his third eye opens, a fireball is directed to Kama. Kama the Lord of desires is burnt to ashes. This initiative is celebrated by Hindus as Vasant Panchami.

Vasant Panchami is associated with the emotions of love and emotional anticipation in Kutch (Gujarat) and is celebrated by preparing bouquets and garlands of flowers set with mango leaves, as a gift. People dress in saffron, pink, or yellow and visit each other. Songs about Krishna's pranks with Radha, considered to mirror Kama-Rati, are sung. This is symbolized with the Hindu deity Kama with his wife Rati.

Traditionally, in Maharashtra, Madhya Pradesh, Chhattisgarh and Uttar Pradesh, after bathing in the morning, people worship Shiva and Parvati. Offerings of mango flowers and the ears of wheat are traditionally made.

Deo temple: Sun God
The shrine of the Sun God in Aurangabad district, Bihar known as the Deo-Sun Shrine, was established on Basant Panchami. The day is celebrated to commemorate the founding of the shrine by King Aila of Allahabad and the birthday of the Sun-Deo God. The statues are washed and old red clothes on them are replaced with new ones on Basant Panchami. Devotees sing, dance and play musical instruments.

Other

People celebrate the day by wearing yellow (white), eating sweet dishes and displaying yellow flowers in homes. In Rajasthan, it is customary for people to wear jasmine garlands. In Maharashtra, newly married couples visit a temple and offer prayers on the first Basant Panchami after the wedding. wearing yellow dresses. In the Punjab region, Sikhs and Hindus wear yellow turban or headdress. In Uttarakhand, in addition to Saraswati Puja, people worship Shiva, Parvati as the mother earth and the crops or agriculture. People eat yellow rice and wear yellow. It is also a significant school supplies shopping and related gift-giving season.

In the Punjab region, Basant is celebrated as a seasonal festival by all faiths and is known as the Basant Festival of Kites. Children buy dor (thread) and guddi or patang (kites) for the sport. The people of the Punjab wear yellow clothes and eat yellow rice to emulate the yellow mustard (sarson) flower fields, or play by flying kites. According to Desai (2010), the tradition of flying kites on various festivals is also found in northern and western Indian states: Hindus in Rajasthan and especially in Gujarat associate kite flying with the period prior to Uttarayan; in Mathura (Uttar Pradesh), kites are flown on Dussehra; in Bengal kite flying takes place on Viskwakarma Puja in September. The sport is also found in Maharashtra, Madhya Pradesh and parts of south India.

On Bali and among Indonesian Hindus, Hari Raya Saraswati (the festival's local name) is celebrated with prayers in family compounds, educational institutions, and public venues from morning to noon. Teachers and students wear brightly coloured clothes instead of their usual uniforms, and children bring traditional cakes and fruit to school for offerings in a temple.

Sikhism
Namdhari Sikhs have historically celebrated Basant Panchami to mark the beginning of spring. Other Sikhs treat it as a spring festival, and joyfully celebrate it by wearing yellow colored clothes, emulating the bright yellow mustard flowers in the fields.

Maharaja Ranjit Singh, the founder of the Sikh Empire, encouraged the celebration of Basant Panchami as a social event in the Gurdwaras. In 1825 CE he gave 2,000 rupees to the Harmandir Sahib Gurdwara in Amritsar to distribute food. He held an annual Basant fair and sponsored kite flying as a regular feature of the fairs. Maharaja Ranjit Singh and his queen Moran would dress in yellow and fly kites on Basant Panchami. Maharaja Ranjit Singh would also hold a darbar or court in Lahore on Basant Panchami which lasted ten days when soldiers would dress in yellow and show their military prowess.

In the Malwa region, the festival of Basant Panchami is celebrated with wearing of yellow dress and kite flying. In Kapurthala and Hoshiarpur, a Basant Panchami fair is held. People attend the fair wearing yellow clothes, turbans or accessories. Sikhs also remember the martyrdom of the child Haqiqat Rai on Basant Panchmi, who was arrested by the Muslim ruler Khan Zakariya Khan after being falsely accused of insulting Islam. Rai was given the choice of converting to Islam or death and, having refused conversion, was executed on the Basant Panchami of 1741 in Lahore, Pakistan.

Nihangs go to Patiala on Basant Panchami and dress in pink and yellow on the month of Vaisakh (not only Basant Panchami day).

Pakistan
Kite flying in Lahore goes back centuries. After creation of Pakistan it evolved into a highly competitive sport which is not limited to "basant" only. There are regional teams, competitions, and trophies. Kite And string making is an industry all over central Punjab providing livelihood to thousands.

Given the shared history and culture in the Indian subcontinent, the Punjabi Muslims in and around Lahore also celebrate kite flying as a sport in Pakistan from home rooftops during the Basant season.

Sufi Muslim Basant
According to Lochan Singh Buxi, Basant Panchmi is a Hindu festival adopted by some Indian Muslim Sufis in the 12th century to mark the grave of the Muslim Sufi saint dargah of Nizamuddin Aulia in Delhi and ever since, has been observed by the Chishti order. According to local Sufi traditions, the poet Amir Khusrau saw Hindu women carry yellow flowers to a temple on Basant and they were dressed in yellow, and he adopted their culture to give some happiness to Nizamuddin Aulia because his nephew died few days ago and he was not recovering from grief, one the Chishti order of Sufi Indian Muslims continue to practice.

Controversy
Vasant Panchami has been a historic occasion of dispute at the archaeological site of Bhojshala (Dhar, Madhya Pradesh) with evidence of an early Saraswati temple (locally called Waghdevi). On the site of Bhojshala is a later era Kamal-Maula mosque, which Muslims use for Friday prayers. The Archeological Survey of India (ASI) has provided annual guidelines, when the Vasant Panchami festival falls on a Friday, announcing hours when Hindus can worship at Bhojshala on Vasant Panchami, and when Muslims can. However, in past years, the Muslim community scheduled earlier has refused to vacate the premises, leading to riots and disorder such as in the 1980s and 1990s.

See also
 Vasanta (Ritu)

References

 "Vasant Panchmi", a book by Anurag Basu.
 "Kite Festival" by Sanjeev Narula.
Saraswati Puja: Quotes, Wishes, Mantras, Images, Songs

Hindu festivals
Religious festivals in India
Hindu festivals in Nepal
January observances
February observances
Festivals in Indonesia
Festivals in West Bengal
Festivals in Odisha
Public holidays in Nepal
Spring festivals
Hindu festivals in India
Observances set by the Pawukon calendar
Days celebrating love